The Phoenix Mountain Mosque is a mosque in Jinniu District, Chengdu, Sichuan Province, China.

Name
The mosque is located between mountains which are shaped like a phoenix; thus the mosque was named as such.

History
The mosque was originally the cemetery for Hui people which was opened in 1952. Later a mosque was built in the area to offer better services to the Muslim community around the area.

See also
 Islam in China
 List of mosques in China

References

1952 establishments in China
Cemeteries in Chengdu
Mosques completed in 1952
Mosques in China